Rao Heidmets (born 15 September 1956 in Pärnu) is an Estonian animated film director, producer and scenarist.

In 1982 he started to work at Tallinnfilm. In 1991 he established his own production company Rao Heidmetsa Filmistuudio. Since 2002 he is a film director in Nukufilm.

In 2005 he was awarded with Order of the White Star, V class.

Filmography

 1983 "Tuvitädi"
 1985 "Nuril"
 1998 "Kallis härra Q"

References

Living people
1956 births
Estonian animated film directors